This is a list of singers from the Kingdom of Cambodia.

0–9

A

B

C

D

E

F

G

H

I

J

K

 Keo Tit Phally

L

M

N

 Nop Nico

O
Seaweed

P

R

 Reth Suzana

S

T

V
 VannDa

W

X

Y

Z

References

 
Cambodian
Singers